The 2013 Men's Asian Champions Trophy was the third edition of the Men's Asian Champions Trophy. The tournament was held alongside the women's tournament in Kakamigara, Japan from 2 to 10 November 2013.

The Six Asian teams (Pakistan, China, India, Japan, Oman and Malaysia) participated in the tournament which involved round-robin league among all teams followed by play-offs for final positions.

The defending champions Pakistan won the tournament for the second time by defeating the hosts Japan 3–1 in the final.

Teams
Below is the list of the participating teams for the tournament

Fixtures
All times are Japan Standard Time (UTC+9)

Round robin

Classification round

Fifth place game

Third place game

Final

Statistics

Final standings

Goalscorers

See also
2013 Men's Hockey Asia Cup
2013 Women's Asian Champions Trophy

Asian Champions Trophy
Men's Asian Champions Trophy
Asian Champions Trophy
International field hockey competitions hosted by Japan
Asian Champions Trophy
Kakamigahara, Gifu
Sport in Gifu Prefecture